The Governor of Sumy Oblast is the head of executive branch for the Sumy Oblast.

The office of Governor is an appointed position, with officeholders being appointed by the President of Ukraine, on recommendation from the Prime Minister of Ukraine, to serve four-year term.

The official residence for the Governor is located in Sumy.

Governors
 Anatoliy Yepifanov (1992–1994, as the Presidential representative)
 Anatoliy Yepifanov (1995–1998, as the Governor)
 Mark Berfman (1998–1999)
 Volodymyr Shcherban (1999–2002)
 Yuriy Zharkov (2002, acting)
 Volodymyr Shcherban (2002–2005)
 Mykola Lavryk (2005)
 Nina Harkava (2005–2006) 
 Volodymyr Sapsai (2006)
 Pavlo Kachur (2006–2008)
 Mykola Lavryk (2008–2010, acting to 2009) 
 Yuriy Chmyr (2010–2013)
 Ihor Yahovdyk (2013–2014) 
 Volodymyr Shulha (2014) 
 Viktor Chernyavskyi (2014, acting) 
 Ivan Borshosh (2014, acting) 
 Mykola Klochko (2014–2019)
 Vadym Akperov (2019, acting)
 Iryna Kupreychyk (2019–2020, acting)
 Dmytro Zhyvytskyi (13 February 2020-11 March 2020)
 Roman Hryschenko (2020)
 Serhiy Pakholchuk (2020, acting)
 Vasyl Khoma (2020–2021)
 Dmytro Zhyvytskyi (2021–2023)
 Taras Savchenko (2023–present) (acting)

Notes

References

Sources
 World Statesmen.org

External links
Government of Sumy Oblast in Ukrainian

 
Sumy Oblast